The 2010 IIHF Challenge Cup of Asia took place in Taiwan from 29 March to 4 April. It was the third annual event, and was run by the International Ice Hockey Federation (IIHF). The games were played in the Taipei Arena in Taipei City. Chinese Taipei won the championship, winning four of its five games and defeating United Arab Emirates in the final 3–2.

Group stage
Nine participating teams were placed in the following two groups. After playing a round-robin, the teams move to the preliminary round to decide the final ranking.

Group A

All times local.

Group B

All times local.

Playoff round

5th–8th playoffs

Bracket

Semi-finals

Seventh place

Fifth place

Medal playoffs

Bracket

Semi-finals

Bronze medal game

Gold medal game

Ranking and statistics

Tournament Awards
Best players selected by the directorate:
Best Goalkeeper:       Khaled Al Suvaidi      
Best Defenseman:       Neimwan Likit
Best Forward:          Ban Kin Loke

Final standings

See also
 List of sporting events in Taiwan

References

External links
International Ice Hockey Federation

Challenge Cup Of Asia, 2010
Iihf Challenge Cup Of Asia, 2010
2010
International ice hockey competitions hosted by Taiwan